Archibald Ernest Olpp (May 12, 1882 – July 26, 1949) was an American physician and politician who served a single term in the U.S. representative from New Jersey. He was the first Republican to be elected to Congress from the New Jersey's 11th congressional district since it was created in 1913.

Biography
Born in South Bethlehem, Pennsylvania, Olpp attended the public schools. He graduated from the Moravian School, Bethlehem, Pennsylvania, in 1899, Lehigh University, Bethlehem, Pennsylvania, in 1903, and from the medical department of the University of Pennsylvania at Philadelphia in 1908.

Olpp was an instructor in chemistry at Lehigh University in 1903 and 1904 and in biological chemistry at the Columbia University College of Physicians and Surgeons, New York City, in 1908 and 1909.

Olpp began the practice of medicine in West Hoboken, New Jersey, in 1909. He served as town physician (1912–1914) and police surgeon and physician to public schools in Secaucus, New Jersey (1916 to 1924).

He served as first lieutenant in the United States Medical Corps during World War I era.

Olpp was elected as a Republican for a single term to the Sixty-seventh Congress (March 4, 1921 – March 3, 1923). Following an unsuccessful reelection bid in 1922, Olpp resumed his medical career.

A resident of Cliffside Park, New Jersey, Olpp died at the age of 67 at Hackensack Hospital on July 26, 1949, after having collapsed in front of a building in Hasbrouck Heights. He was interred in Brookside Cemetery, Englewood, New Jersey.

References

External links
 Retrieved on 2009-02-19
Archibald Ernest Olpp at The Political Graveyard

1882 births
1949 deaths
Lehigh University alumni
Lehigh University faculty
Columbia University faculty
People from Cliffside Park, New Jersey
United States Army Medical Corps officers
Physicians from New Jersey
Republican Party members of the United States House of Representatives from New Jersey
Burials at Brookside Cemetery (Englewood, New Jersey)
Perelman School of Medicine at the University of Pennsylvania alumni
20th-century American politicians
Military personnel from New Jersey